CFL2 can refer to:
 Empress North 6 (Plains Midstream Canada) Aerodrome
 CFL2 (gene)